For the club in Nara, Japan, see Nara Club.

Nara United Football Club is a Thailand professional football club based in Narathiwat province. The club is currently playing in the Thai League 3 Southern region. The team lifted the league division 2 southern zone and Super Champion Cup title in 2009 and 2010 which became one of the most successful seasons in their history.

Nara United was founded in 2010 and its rivalries are Satun United and Yala F.C. which also based in Thailand southern border. The team is widely known by their nickname The Kolek Boet warriors which can be seen in the club logo.

History

The early years 
Nara United is a football club from city of Narathiwat established from the football club of Sports Association of Narathiwat Province. They first participated in the Football Cup in National Games Tournament at Rachaburi province. 
In the year 2006, the club joined the Thailand Professional League in the name of Narathiwat Football Club, and in 2011, The club return to join the Regional League Division 2 Southern in the name of Nara United Football Club after separated from Narathiwat FC. The club had the nickname as The Kolak Boat Warriors and changed their logo in 2010 season accordingly.

First major successes
In 2009 they won the gold medal in the National Games 38th title at Trang province by beating Ratchaburi1–0 at the Trang Central Stadium, and now they moved to Regional League Division 2 Southern in the 2011 season. The Kolak Boat Warriors tribes finished 7th place in the First leg of Thai League division 2 southern zone 2011 season.

In 2010 they were invited to play in the Super Champion Cup and reached the final, defeating the likes of Phitsanulok, Ayutthaya and Kasem Bundit University along the way. In the final they won above Chiangrai United 3–0 in the second games after first games they drawn 0–0.

In 2010 they were again invited to participate in the 39th National Games at Chonburi province, but were defeated in the semi-finals round against Chonburi F.C., they lost 1–2 in normal play. They have formed links with Chonburi.

Regional League Division 2 Southern
Nara United played in the first Regional League Division 2 Southern in 2011 with the lost against Last season runner up Trang by scored 2–3. On March 3, 2011 the club achieved its first victory in the Regional League Division 2 Southern against the highly fancied Chumphon. In the latest game against Hatyai F.C., it was clouded by enjoyable when Hat Yai scored their only goal in the first of that games. It mattered little when Nara United striker Hasen Maeroh scored a goal from 35 yards out and then followed it up with a second goal also become a hat trick hero in that game to condemn Hat Yai to their third loss in the competition 3–1.

Stadium
At the start of the Regional League Division 2 Southern, Nara United used the Bangnara Arena Stadium or Narathiwat Municipality Stadium for the first half of the season, but due to a dispute with the local authority, in 2011 they moved back to Nara Forest Side Stadium or Narathiwat Provincial Administrative Organization Stadium.

Supporters
Supporters of Nara United are often referred to as the Kolak Mania which refers to the Kolak boat symbol of the club.

Honours

Domestic leagues
Regional League South Division
 Winners (2) : 2009, 2013

Friendly competitions
Thailand National Games
 Gold medal (1) : 2009
 Silver medal (1) : 2006
 bronze medal (1) : 2010
Super Champions Cup
 Winners (1) : 2010
 Sungai Kolok Cup
 Winners (1): 2011
 S'5 Unity League
 Runners-up (1): 2008
 S'5 Unity Youth cup U-20
Winners (3): 2007, 2008, 2009
Runners-up (1):'' 2010
 Southern royal shield Trophy 2009 (Phangga Cup)
Winners (1): 2009

Stadium and locations

Season by season record

Players

Current squad

Alliance Clubs
 Chonburi F.C.
 Thai Port F.C.
 Pattani F.C.
 Kelantan FA
 Kedah FA

References

External links
 Official Website
 Official Fanpage

 
Association football clubs established in 2010
Football clubs in Thailand
2010 establishments in Thailand
Sport in Narathiwat province